Senja is a municipality in Troms og Finnmark county, Norway. It was established on 1 January 2020 when the municipalities of Berg, Lenvik, Torsken, and Tranøy were merged into one municipality. It is located in the traditional district of Hålogaland. The administrative centre of the municipality is the town of Finnsnes. The municipality includes all of the island of Senja, the smaller surrounding islands, and part of the mainland between the Gisundet strait and the Malangen fjord.

The  municipality is the 40th largest by area out of the 356 municipalities in Norway. Senja is the 84th most populous municipality in Norway with a population of 14,738.

General information
In March 2017, the Parliament of Norway voted to merge the municipalities of Berg, Torsken, Lenvik, and Tranøy. The new municipality was established on 1 January 2020 as Senja Municipality.

Etymology
The Old Norse form of the name must also have been Senja or perhaps Sændja. The meaning of the name is unknown, but it might be related to the verb sundra which means to "tear" or "split apart", possibly because the west coast of the island is torn and split by numerous small fjords. It might also be derived from a Proto-Norse form of the word Sandijōn meaning "(area) of sand" or "sandy island".

Coat of arms
The coat of arms was approved for use starting on 1 January 2020. The blazon is "Azure, northern lights vert over mountain peaks argent to sinister". This means the arms have a dark blue field (background) and the charge is  the green northern lights above some mountain peaks. The mountain peaks have a tincture of argent which means they are commonly colored white, but if it is made out of metal, then silver is used. The mountain peak is a depiction of the Okshornan mountain.

Churches
The Church of Norway has four parishes within the municipality of Senja. It is part of the Senja prosti (deanery) in the Diocese of Nord-Hålogaland.

Government
All municipalities in Norway, including Senja, are responsible for primary education (through 10th grade), outpatient health services, senior citizen services, unemployment and other social services, zoning, economic development, and municipal roads. The municipality is governed by a municipal council of elected representatives, which in turn elects a mayor.  The municipality falls under the Senja District Court and the Hålogaland Court of Appeal.

Municipal council
The municipal council  of Senja is made up of 45 representatives that are elected to four year terms. The party breakdown of the council is as follows:

Geography

The island of Senja is located along the Troms county coastline with Finnsnes as the closest town. Senja is connected to the mainland by the Gisund Bridge. The island has one municipality with the same name  which also has a mainland part, which is where the municipality admistration is.<northern coasts of Senja faces the open sea, the western coast faces the islands of Andøya and Krøttøya, the southern coast faces the islands of Andørja and Dyrøya. On the western coast, steep and rugged mountains rise straight from the sea, with some fishing villages (like Gryllefjord, Husøy) tucked into the small lowland areas between the mountains and the sea. The eastern and southern parts of the island are milder, with rounder mountains, forests, rivers and agriculture land.

Senja is often referred to as "Norway in miniature", as the island's diverse scenery reflects almost the entire span of Norwegian nature. Senja is known domestically for its natural environment, and is marketed as a tourist attraction.

Climate
Climate data from the village of Gibostad on the eastern shore of the island, facing the mainland during the base period of 1961–1990. The western side of the island, facing the Norwegian Sea, will have slightly milder but more windy winters.

Attractions
Among the sights of the island are Ånderdalen National Park with coastal pine forests and mountains, traditional fishing communities, and the Senja Troll, the world's largest troll. The southernmost municipality Tranøy also has several small museums documenting local history, among these the Halibut Museum ("Kveitmuseet") in Skrolsvik.

Notable people 

 Anders Olsen (1718 on the island of Senja - 1786) a trader, explorer and colonial administrator
 Bjarne Daniel Solli (1910 in Lenvik – 1989) politician, Mayor of Lenvik 1945-1953
 Arvid Nergård (1923 in Lenvik – 2006) Bishop of Nord-Hålogaland in Tromsø 1979-1990
 Per Kleiva (1931 in Torsken – 2017) a Norwegian painter and graphic artist
 Ottar Brox (born 1932 in Torsken) an authority in social science, academic and politician
 Arvid Hanssen (1932–1998) newspaper editor, poet and novelist; his bust stands in Finnsnes
 Hans Kristian Eriksen (1933–2014) a non-fiction writer, magazine editor, novelist and short story writer & schoolteacher on the island of Senja 1954-1978
 Geir-Inge Sivertsen (born 1965) an engineer and politician, Mayor of Lenvik 2011-2019
 Maria Haukaas Mittet (born 1979 in Finnsnes) singer at the 2008 Eurovision Song Contest
 Andreas Amundsen (born 1980 on the island of Senja) a Norwegian jazz bassist
 Pål Moddi Knutsen (born 1987 in Senja), stage name Moddi, is a musician, author and activist

Sport 
 Harald Vassboten (1893 in Lenvik – 1973) a sport wrestler, competed at the 1920 Summer Olympics 
 Christer Johnsgård (born 1987 in Silsand) a footballer, with over 175 club caps
 Lars Gunnar Johnsen (born 1991 in Silsand) a footballer, with over 200 club caps

Media gallery

References

 
Municipalities of Troms og Finnmark
2020 establishments in Norway
Populated places established in 2020